The Procolophonia are a suborder of herbivorous reptiles that lived from the Middle Permian till the end of the Triassic period.  They were originally included as a suborder of the Cotylosauria (later renamed Captorhinida Carroll 1988)  but are now considered a clade of Parareptilia.  They are closely related to other generally lizard-like Permian reptiles such as the Millerettidae, Bolosauridae, Acleistorhinidae, and  Lanthanosuchidae, all of which are included under the Anapsida or "Parareptiles" (as opposed to the Eureptilia).

Classification
There are two main groups of Procolophonia, the small, lizard-like Procolophonoidea, and the Pareiasauroidea, which include the large, armoured Pareiasauridae. According to the traditional classification of Carroll 1988 as well as recent phylogenetic analyses, smaller groups like Rhipaeosauridae (now a synonym of Nycteroleteridae) and Sclerosauridae are classified with the pareiasaurs and with the procolophonids, respectively. The Nyctiphruretidae was thought to represent the sister taxon of Procolophonia by many studies, however recently discovered material places it within the group, as the sister taxon of Procolophonoidea.

The following cladogram is simplified after the phylogenetic analysis of MacDougall and Reisz (2014) and shows the placement of Procolophonia within Parareptilia. Relationships within bolded terminal clades are not shown.

Relationship to turtles
The procolophonians were traditionally thought to be ancestral to the turtles, although experts disagreed over whether turtle ancestors would be found among the Procolophonidae, the Pareiasauridae (Lee 1995,1996, 1997), or simply a generic Procolophonian ancestor.  Laurin & Reisz, 1995 and Laurin & Gauthier 1996 defined the Procolophonia cladistically as "The most recent common ancestor of pareiasaurs, procolophonids, and testudines (Chelonia), and all its descendants", and listed a number of autapomorphies. However, Rieppel and deBraga 1996 and deBraga & Rieppel, 1997 argued that turtles evolved from Sauropterygians, which would mean that the Parareptilia and Procolophonia constitute wholly extinct clades that are only distantly related to living reptiles. The first genome-wide phylogenetic analysis of turtle relationships was completed by Wang et al. (2013). Using the draft genomes of Chelonia mydas and Pelodiscus sinensis, the team used the largest turtle data set to date in their analysis and concluded that turtles are likely a sister group of crocodilians and birds (Archosauria). This placement within the diapsids suggests that the turtle lineage lost diapsid skull characteristics as it now possesses an anapsid skull.

References 
Notes

Sources
 Carroll, R. L., (1988), Vertebrate Paleontology and Evolution (incl. Appendix; Vertebrate Classification), W.H. Freeman & Co. New York
 deBraga M. & O. Rieppel. 1997. Reptile phylogeny and the interrelationships of turtles. Zoological Journal of the Linnean Society 120: 281-354.
 Kuhn, O, 1969, Cotylosauria, part 6 of Handbuch der Palaoherpetologie (Encyclopedia of Palaeoherpetology), Gustav Fischer Verlag, Stuttgart & Portland 
 Laurin, M., & Gauthier, J. A., 1996 Phylogeny and Classification of Amniotes, at the Tree of Life Web Project
 Laurin, M. & R. R. Reisz. 1995. A reevaluation of early amniote phylogeny. Zoological Journal of the Linnean Society 113: 165-223. 
 Lee, M. S. Y. 1995. Historical burden in systematics and the interrelationships of 'Parareptiles'. Biological Reviews of the Cambridge Philosophical Society 70: 459-547. 
 Lee M. S. Y. 1996. Correlated progression and the origin of turtles. Nature 379: 812-815. 
 Lee, M. S. Y., 1997: Pareiasaur phylogeny and the origin of turtles. Zoological Journal of the Linnean Society: Vol. 120, pp. 197–280 
 Rieppel O. & M. deBraga. 1996. Turtles as diapsid reptiles. Nature 384: 453-455.

External links
 Basal Anapsids - Palaeos

Procolophonomorphs
Permian reptiles
Triassic reptiles
Guadalupian first appearances
Late Triassic extinctions